CD72 (Cluster of Differentiation 72), also known in murine biology as Lyb-2, is a protein active in the immune system of animals.  It consists of two identical halves, each of about 39-43 kD, and is a C-type lectin.  Its primarily locus of expression is B-cells (from the pro-B through the mature B-cell stage), where it appears to mediate aspects of B-cell - T-cell interaction.  It is a ligand for CD5.

CD72 is a regulatory protein on B lymphocytes. The cytoplasmic tail of CD72 contains two potential immunoreceptor tyrosine-based inhibitory motifs, one of which has been shown to recruit the tyrosine phosphatase SHP- 1. These features suggest a negative regulatory role for CD72. CD72 is a nonredundant regulator of B-cell development and a negative regulator of B-cell responsiveness.

See also 
 Cluster of differentiation

References

External links 
Dr. Jane Parnes lab at Stanford University

Clusters of differentiation